Urophora rufipes is a species of fruit fly in the family Tephritidae.

Distribution
United States.

References

Urophora
Insects described in 1932
Diptera of North America